This is a list of the main career statistics of Argentine professional tennis player Gastón Gaudio.

Historic Achievements 
By winning the 2004 French Open, Gaudio became the first Argentine to win a Grand Slam since Guillermo Vilas in 1979, and the first man ever to win a Grand Slam after losing the first set 6–0. He became the fifth-lowest-ranked player to win a Grand Slam, and the only men together with Novak Djokovic to date in the open era to win a Grand Slam having saved match points in the final.

Grand Slam finals

Singles: 1 (1 title)

ATP career finals

Singles: 16 (8 titles, 8 runners-up)

Doubles: 3 (3 titles)

Other finals

ATP Challengers and ITF Futures finals: 10 (8 titles, 2 runners-up) 
Wins (8)

Runners-up (2)

Exhibition finals: ? (? titles, ? runners-up)

Performance timelines

Singles 

Davis Cup and World Team Cup matches are included in the statistics. Walkovers are neither official wins nor official losses.

Doubles 
Davis Cup and World Team Cup matches are included in the statistics. Walkovers are neither official wins nor official losses.

Winning streaks

Career Grand Slam tournament seedings 
The tournaments won by Gaudio are in boldface.

Record against other players

Top 10 wins

ATP Tour career earnings

ITF Davis Cup

Summer Olympics matches

Singles

References

External links 
 
 
 

Tennis career statistics